Bernardin-Johnson House is a historic home located at Evansville, Indiana. It was designed by Edward Joseph Thole of the architecture firm Clifford Shopbell & Co. and built in 1917. It is a -story, Georgian Revival / Colonial Revival style brick dwelling with a two-story wing. It has a slate gable roof and features a pedimented portico with fluted Ionic order columns.  After 1919, it was owned by Edward Mead Johnson (1852-1934).

It was added to the National Register of Historic Places in 1989.

References

Houses on the National Register of Historic Places in Indiana
Georgian Revival architecture in Indiana
Colonial Revival architecture in Indiana
Houses completed in 1917
Houses in Evansville, Indiana
National Register of Historic Places in Evansville, Indiana